Mary-Anne O'Neill  (born 20 April 1955) is an Australian politician. She was a Labor Party member of the Legislative Assembly of Queensland from 2009 to 2012.

O'Neill was born and grew up in Tumut, New South Wales, and received higher education in Canberra. She was a union organiser before entering politics. In 2009, she was elected as the Labor member of the Legislative Assembly of Queensland for Kallangur, succeeding Ken Hayward, who retired.

References

1955 births
Living people
Members of the Queensland Legislative Assembly
Australian Labor Party members of the Parliament of Queensland
21st-century Australian politicians
Women members of the Queensland Legislative Assembly
21st-century Australian women politicians